N. V. Krishna Warrier (May 13, 1916 – October 12, 1989) was an Indian poet, journalist, scholar, academician and political thinker. A prolific writer, Warrier's works covered the genres of poetry, drama, travelogue, translation, children's literature and science. He was a recipient of the Sahitya Akademi Award and the Kerala Sahitya Akademi Award for Poetry. The Kerala Sahitya Akademi honoured him with their fellowship in 1986, three years before his death in 1989.

Biography
Nerukkavu Variam Krishna Warrier was born on May 13, 1916 at Njeruvisseri, near Arattupuzha in Thrissur district of the south Indian state of Kerala to Padikkaparambu Warriath Achutha Warrier and Madhavi Warasyar. He had two brothers, Shankara Warrier and Achutha Warrier and a sister, Ikkalikutti Warasyar. His early schooling was at the primary school in Vallachira after which he studied at the Sanskrit school in Peruvanam where he had the opportunity to study under Meloth Raghavan Nambiar and Keshavan Elayathu, both Sanskrit scholars. Later, he studied grammar under B. Sankaranarayana Shasthri of Tripunithura Sanskrit School (present-day Government Sanskrit College, Tripunithura) to pass Vyakarana Bhooshanam examination and learned Kavyaprakasham and Dhwanyalokam under K. Rama Pisharodi to pass Kavya Shiromani examination. Simultaneously, he passed Hindi Visharad examination too.

Warrier started his career as a tutor at the Government Sanskrit College, Tripunithura but moved to Sreemoolanagaram Sanskrit School and later to Brahmanandodayam Sanskrit School, Kalady. In 1942, he resigned from his job to participate in Quit India Movement and ran a newspaper, Swathanthra Bharatham while in hiding. Afterwards, he joined Govt High School Kodakara as a teacher and in 1948, joined Sree Kerala Varma College as its faculty. Subsequently, he had a short stint at Madras Christian College, too, before joining Mathrubhumi in 1952 as a member of its editorial board where he stayed until he was selected as the founder director of Kerala Bhasha Institute in 1968. After his superannuation from the institute in 1975, he rejoined Mathrubhumi as the chief editor; he also worked with Kunkumam weekly for a short while.

Warrier was married to Palakkattu Kattukulath Puthan Warriath Lakshmikutty Warasyar, the marriage taking place in 1948, and the couple had 3 daughters, Usha, Parvathy and Vani, all of them medical doctors. His death came on October 12, 1989 at Kozhikode at the age of 73.

Legacy 
Krishna Warrier, a polyglot who could handle 18 languages, was a writer whose body of work covered several genres of literature such as poetry, drama, travelogue, translation, children's literature and science. He was the author the Kerala Sahitya Akademi Award winning Gandhiyum Godseyum, a poem where he positioned Mohandas Gandhi and Nathuram Godse in various situations in the post-independent India for commenting on the socio-political state of affairs. Besides other poetry anthologies like Kochuthomman and Kalidasante Simhasanam, he also wrote literary criticisms such as Vallatholinte Kavyasilpam and a treatise in English, titled A History of Malayalam Metre.

Krishna Warrier was the first editor of Akhila Vijnana Kosam, an encyclopaedia in Malayalam. He was considered one of the best literary editors of his times. He is also credited with efforts on modernisation of Malayalam language; it was during his time as the head of the Kerala Bhasha Institute, the institute initiated efforts to modernise Malayalam typewriter. Krishna Warrier presided the Kerala Union of Working Journalists and the Sahitya Pravathaka Sahakarana Sangham (SPCS), served as a member of the Sahitya Akademi (advisory committee on Malayalam) and Kerala Sahitya Akademi, held the position of the treasurer of Kerala Sasthra Sahithya Parishad, chaired the Sanskrit Committee of the Government of Kerala and sat in the advisory committee of the Jnanpith Award.

Awards and honours 
Kerala Sahitya Akademi selected Krishna Warrier for their annual award for poetry in 1970, for his work, Gandhiyum Godseyum. Seven years later, he received the 1979 Kendra Sahitya Akademi Award for his book Vallatholinte Kavyasilpam (literary criticism). Kerala Sahitya Akademi honoured him again in 1986 with their Fellowship. He was also honoured by the University of Calicut by awarding him the degree of DLitt.

Two eponymous organizations have been formed in his memory, the N. V. Krishna Warrior Memorial Trust and the N. V. Sahitya Vedi; the former has instituted an annual literary award, the N. V. Krishna Warrior Literary Award while the latter has its own award in the name of N. V. Sahitya Vedi Award. N. V. Krishna Warrior Memorial Trust have also launched a digital archive to conserve Warrier's work online.

Positions held

 Teacher – Sanskrit School, Kaladi
 Teacher – Sanskrit College, Tripunithura
 Publisher – Swathanthra Bharatham
 Chief Editor – Mathrubhumi
 Director – Kerala Bhasha Institute
 Editor – Kumkumam
 Editor – Yuga Prabhath. 
 Editor – Akhila Vijnana Kosam
 President – Kerala Union of Working Journalists
 President – Sahitya Pravathaka Sahakarana Sangham (SPCS)
 President – Kerala Sahitya Parishad
 President – Kerala Sahitya Sammithi
 Member – Kerala Sahitya Akademi
 Member – National Book Development Council
 Member – Official Bhasha Committee.

Bibliography

Poetry

Translations

Essays and literary criticisms

Plays

Attakkatha

Biographies

Children's literature

Travelogues

Other works

Works on N. V. Krishna Warrier

References

Further reading

External links
 
 

People from Thrissur district
Writers from Kerala
Malayalam-language writers
Indian Sanskrit scholars
Hindu poets
Recipients of the Sahitya Akademi Award in Malayalam
Recipients of the Kerala Sahitya Akademi Award
1989 deaths
1916 births
20th-century Indian poets
20th-century Indian journalists
Journalists from Kerala
Indian magazine editors
[[Category:20th-century Indian essayists